Graciela Beltrán (born December 29, 1974) is an American singer. She began singing in the Los Angeles area at the age of six at restaurants and parties. According to MTV she is "widely known as one of regional Mexican music's most influential female voices. Beltran is credited with helping to form the genre, as well as solidifying a woman's place in it."

Beltrán was included on the album Las Reinas Del Pueblo, with famous Mexican-American singer Selena, which has sold over 5 million copies worldwide.

Early life
While some sources give her place of birth as Sinaloa, in a small town called Costa Rica, Beltrán stated in an interview that she was born on U.S. soil. She began her music career entertaining the neighbors whom were her first followers. She has faced various family tragedies including the kidnapping of her brother whose body was never found, the murder of her brother-in-law and was even a witness to her step-father's killing when she was nine.

It was in Los Angeles where Beltrán's music career took off when she first stepped onto a professional stage. Under the name Gracielita Beltran, she began recording albums of norteño, banda and mariachi music with local musicians. Four years later, Beltran was noticed by record execs at EMI, who offered to produce her next record. "Baraja de Oro" was one of the first singles from the six albums Beltran recorded with EMI. At the 8th and 9th Lo Nuestro Awards, Beltran was nominated for Regional Mexican Female Singer of the Year.

Career

Aside from the many awards, Graciela Beltrán is also proud of the many professional collaborations she has participated in during her career. These include duets with Ednita Nazario, Emilio Navaira, Los Tucanes de Tijuana, Chalino Sánchez, Adán Sánchez, Banda Machos, Grupo Modelo, Conjunto Primavera and recently with El Chapo de Sinaloa. Her compilation album with Selena, titled Las Reinas Del Pueblo has sold 5 million copies worldwide. She has also worked with well-known and respected producers such as Juan Carlos Calderon, K.C. Porter, Bebu Silvetti, Los Cuates Omar y Adolfo Valenzuela and Joan Sebastian. She has shared the stage with Vicente Fernández among many other successful artists. In 2006, Graciela was the special guest for the Cinco de Mayo celebrations that year after year are held at the White House, in this occasion, she shared her talent and music in front of the President of the United States George W. Bush. She has racked up five film appearances and a discography with 20 original titles, the latter half of them with the Mexican Univision label. Her career consists of appearances in Sábado Gigante, Siempre en Domingo and various shows around the world.

After nearly four years of absence in the Recording Industry Graciela Beltran returned in 2014 with her own record label and three new productions One Album Excitos with Mariachi "Homenaje A La Voz Ranchera, Another Album with Banda Sinaloense with All new songs and finally a CD/DVD with Live Banda Sinaloense, Mariachi and Pop/Rock group.

Currently, 2013-2014 Promoting her New Upcoming Albums in her Extensive Tour in the U.S. and Mexico has been Accompanied by her Banda Sinaloense and Mariachi.

2004 Premio Las Palmas de Oro como "La mejor cantante de música de Banda en México".

2004 Premio Micrófono de Oro como "Cantante juvenil más destacada en música de Banda", otorgado por la Asociación Nacional de Locutores en México y La Fundación Guillermo Romo.

Cintas Acuario Records
2007 Premio Lo Nuestro A La Trayectoria por sus 20 años en la música Regional Mexicana.

As of 2017, Beltrán has released 26 albums throughout her career.

Discography
Albums
1987: Gracielita Beltrán
1988: Gracielita Beltrán – 16 exitos'''
1989: La Estrellita de Sinaloa1989: Revelación Ranchero1989: La Pochita de Sinaloa1990: Gracielita Beltrán con la Banda Culiacán1991: Graciela Beltrán - Voy a morir por ti - con Mariachi
1992: Juntos Cantan a México con Mariachi con Chalino Sánchez
1993: Mis Mejores Canciones – 17 Super Exitos1993: Graciela Beltrán con la Banda Santa Cruz1994: 12 Super Exitos1995: Tesoro1995: Las Reinas Del Pueblo con Selena 
1995: Te Sigo Extrañando a dúo con Grupo Modelo - Single
1996: Mi Corazón Es Tuyo1996: Graciela Beltrán y Los Tucanes de Tijuana - Single
1997: Tuya - con Mariachi
1998: La Reina Del Pueblo con Banda y Mariachi1998: Robame Un Beso - Producido por Joan Sebastian
1998: Graciela Beltrán con Banda – Grandes y Nuevos Exitos1998: Navidad Para Mi Pueblo - Junto con otros artistas
1999: Graciela Beltrán con Banda – Grandes y Nuevos Exitos Volumen 21999: La Reina Del Pueblo con Banda2000: La Reyna Del Pueblo 20002001: Para Mi Pueblo2001: Esto Es Lo Nuestro2002: A Los Grandes2003: No Me Arrepiento De Nada2003: Graciela Beltrán – La Historia - Incluye 10 Videos
2004: Mi Otro Sentimiento2006: Rancherisimas con Banda2007: Promesas No2007: Mujeres Bravas2008: Una Reina En Hollywood2009: La Reina De La Banda2014: Homenaje A La Voz Ranchera
2017: Évitame La Pena

Filmography
 1990 Ni Parientes Somos as Herself
 1991 El Corrido De Los Perez as Herself
 1994 La Reina de las Bandas as Herself
 1994 La Quebradita as Herself
 2014 ''Tongue Tied" as Marielena

References

External links
 
 
 
 Graciela Beltrán at Gente PV 

American women pop singers
1974 births
Living people
American banda musicians
American mariachi musicians
Hispanic and Latino American women singers
Tejano pop musicians
American musicians of Mexican descent
Fonovisa Records artists
Women in Latin music
20th-century American women singers
21st-century American women singers
American Latin pop singers
20th-century American singers